The Jordan 196 was the car with which the Jordan team competed in the  Formula One season.  It was driven by Rubens Barrichello, who was in his fourth and final season with the team, and Martin Brundle, who moved from Ligier for what was to be his last season in F1.

Racing history 
The team was in its second year with works Peugeot engines, and had also secured a lucrative sponsorship deal with Benson and Hedges that saw the cars turn gold for the majority of the 1996 season, having been launched in a pre-B&H green-yellow-red livery and raced for the first five races in a mustard shade that failed to impress on TV.

However, the team still proved unable to score the elusive first win.  Indeed, 1996 was a barren season with no podium finishes from either driver, although the team did score one more point than in 1995.  Jordan remained a 'Second Division' team behind Williams, Ferrari, Benetton and McLaren. Brundle later, albeit in a jocular fashion, referred to the 196 as "a dog" which had "more grip upside down", referring to an accident on the opening lap of the 1996 Australian Grand Prix where Brundle rolled the car.

By the end of the year, the need for change was obvious. Barrichello departed for the new Stewart team, and Brundle retired from the sport becoming a television co-commentator alongside Murray Walker for ITV F1 for the 1997 season.

The team eventually finished fifth in the Constructors' Championship, with 22 points.

Complete Formula One results
(key) (results in bold indicate pole position)

References

Jordan Formula One cars
1996 Formula One season cars